Královice is a municipal district (městská část) in Prague, Czech Republic.

References

Districts of Prague